Georges Renavent (born Georges DeChaux, April 23, 1892 – January 2, 1969) was a French-American actor in film, Broadway plays and operator of American Grand Guignol. He was born in Paris, France. In 1914, he immigrated to the United States, crossing the frontier between Canada and Vermont.

He was married to Selena Royle, an actress and daughter of Edwin Milton Royle, author of The Squaw Man, which was adapted for film and starred Cecil B. DeMille.

They left the United States to live in Mexico after Selena was entangled in the McCarthy era Communism investigations and Hollywood blacklist. While in Mexico, both Selena and Georges continued to be active in the arts and put out various cookbooks, including Pheasants for Peasants, A Gringa's Guide to Mexican Cooking, and Guadalajara As I Know, Live It, Love It.

Acting career
His first American film appearance was in The Seven Sisters (1915). Fourteen years later, Renavent played an impressive starring role as the Kinkajou in the musical spectacular, Rio Rita (1929).

Rio Rita was based on a 1927 stage musical by Florenz Ziegfeld, which originally united Wheeler and Woolsey as a team and made them famous. In 1929, Radio Pictures, later known as RKO Radio Pictures, purchased the film rights to this musical. The last portion of the film was photographed in Technicolor.

Renavent also starred in East of Borneo (1931), which was one of the most frequently telecast films of the 1950s and 1960s. East of Borneo starred Rose Hobart as Linda, the wife of African missionary Dr. Clark (Charles Bickford). whom she finds he's been living in luxury as court physician of the Prince of Marudu (Renavent).

East of Borneo went on to achieve latter-day fame when avant-garde filmmaker Joseph Cornell spliced together all of the leading lady's close-ups, and came up with a surrealistic exercise titled Rose Hobart (1936). When Cornell screened the film, Salvador Dalí was in attendance. Dalí was incensed that Cornell had created such a masterpiece before he could.

In 1936, Renavent played opposite Boris Karloff and Bela Lugosi in The Invisible Ray (1936). He appeared in Hal Roach's Turnabout (1940). His final film was made in 1952, when he played Ortega in Mara Maru, with Errol Flynn.

Broadway career

Renavent also ran his own American Grand Guignol and was involved in many Broadway plays in New York.

Death

Renavent died in Guadalajara, Mexico in 1969. He is survived by his granddaughter, Lynne Paretti Smaldone and her two sons,
Matthew Aaron Smaldone and Gregory Andrew Smaldone and his grandson, Michael Paretti and his daughter Lisa Paretti. His daughter, Francette Paretti died in 2010.

Selected filmography 

 The Seven Sisters (1915) - Toni
 American - That's All (1917) - Lounge Lizard
 The Light (1919) - Auchat
 Erstwhile Susan (1919) - Emanual Dreary
 Rio Rita (1929) - General Ravinoff
 Slightly Scarlet (1930) - Inspector (uncredited)
 Le spectre vert (1930) - Dr. Ballon
 Scotland Yard (1930) - Dr. Dean
 Once a Sinner (1931) - Salon Manager (uncredited)
 The Magnificent Lie (1931) - French Military Doctor (uncredited)
 East of Borneo (1931) - Hashim—Prince of Marudu
 Arsène Lupin (1932) - Duval (uncredited)
 Whistlin' Dan (1932) - Capt. Serge Karloff
 Le bluffeur (1932) - Mr. Banks
 L'amour guide (1933) - Marco
 Private Detective 62 (1933) - Captain La Farge (uncredited)
 Ever in My Heart (1933) - Party Guest (uncredited)
 Queen Christina (1933) - Chanut, the French Ambassador
 Bombay Mail (1934) - Dr. Maurice Lenoir
 Moulin Rouge (1934) - Frenchman
 Fashions of 1934 (1934) - Paris Couturier (uncredited)
 The House of Rothschild (1934) - Count Talleyrand
 Stingaree (1934)  - Coutouriere (uncredited)
 Stamboul Quest (1934) - Hotel Manager (uncredited)
 The Merry Widow (1934) - Adamovitch (uncredited)
 The White Cockatoo (1935) - Pierre
 Folies Bergère (1935) - Premier of France
 The Flame Within (1935) - Apartment House Manager (uncredited)
 Front Page Woman (1935) - Robert Chinard
 Anna Karenina (1935) - Attaché (uncredited)
 The Last Outpost (1935) - Turkish major (uncredited)
 Whipsaw (1935) - Monetta
 Captain Blood (1935) - French Captain (uncredited)
 The Invisible Ray (1936) - Chief of the Surete
 The Sky Parade (1936) - Baron Ankrovith (uncredited)
 China Clipper (1936) - Pan American Union Speaker (uncredited)
 The Charge of the Light Brigade (1936) - Gen. Canrobert (uncredited)
 Love Letters of a Star (1936) - Harrington
 Lloyd's of London (1936) - French Lieutenant
 She's Dangerous (1937) - Eduardo the Headwaiter (uncredited)
 History Is Made at Night (1937) - Insp. Millard (uncredited)
 Seventh Heaven (1937) - Sergeant Gendarme
 The King and the Chorus Girl (1937) - Yacht Captain (uncredited)
 Thin Ice (1937) - Head Porter (uncredited)
 Cafe Metropole (1937) - Captain
 Love Under Fire (1937) - Captain Contreras
 Fit for a King (1937) - Paul (uncredited)
 The Sheik Steps Out (1937) - Count Mario
 Wife, Doctor and Nurse (1937) - Nick
 Fight for Your Lady (1937) - Joris
 Charlie Chan at Monte Carlo (1937) - Renault
 Love and Hisses (1937) - Count Pierre Raoul Guerin
 Jezebel (1938) - De Lautruc
 Fools for Scandal (1938) - Le Petit Harlem Headwaiter (uncredited)
 Judge Hardy's Children (1938) - Mr. Cortot (uncredited)
 A Trip to Paris (1938) - Captain of Intelligence (uncredited)
 The Adventures of Robin Hood (1938) - Saxon peasant (uncredited)
 Blind Alibi (1938) - Art Dealer (uncredited)
 Gold Diggers in Paris (1938) - Gendarme
 The Young in Heart (1938) - Detective Sergeant (uncredited)
 I'll Give a Million (1938) - Gendarme
 Four's a Crowd (1938) - Enrico (uncredited)
 Suez (1938) - Bank President
 Sharpshooters (1938) - Police Chief (uncredited)
 Artists and Models Abroad (1938) - Prefect of Police
 Topper Takes a Trip (1938) - Magistrate
 Mr. Moto's Last Warning (1939) - Adm. Jacques Delacour (uncredited)
 The Three Musketeers (1939) - Captain Fageon
 The Adventures of Jane Arden (1939) - Frenchman (scenes deleted)
 Chasing Danger (1939) - French Colonel (uncredited)
 Indianapolis Speedway (1939) - Headwaiter (uncredited)
 Lady of the Tropics (1939) - Hotel Manager (uncredited)
 Pack Up Your Troubles (1939) - Col. Giraud
 Everything Happens at Night (1939) - Gendarme on Dock (uncredited)
 The House Across the Bay (1940) - French Official
 Turnabout (1940) - Mr. Ram
 Brother Orchid (1940) - Cable Office Clerk (uncredited)
 A Dispatch from Reuters (1940) - French Official (uncredited)
 Christmas in July (1940) - Office Door Sign-Painter (uncredited)
 The Son of Monte Cristo (1940) - Marquis de Chatante
 Comrade X (1940) - Laszlo
 Back Street (1941) - Doctor (voice, uncredited)
 That Hamilton Woman (1941) - Hotel Manager (uncredited)
 The Great Lie (1941) - Maitre d'Hotel (uncredited)
 That Night in Rio (1941) - Ambassador
 Road to Zanzibar (1941) - Saunders - Hotel Owner (uncredited)
 They Dare Not Love (1941) - Belgian Captain (uncredited)
 The Night of January 16th (1941) - Anton Haraba - Man With Briefcase (uncredited)
 Paris Calling (1941) - Butler
 Sullivan's Travels (1941) - Old Tramp
 Spy Smasher (1942) - Gov. LeComte [Ch. 3]
 Perils of Nyoka (1942) - Maghreb - Vultura's High Priest [Chs.1-4,7,9,15]
 I Married an Angel (1942) - Pierre Durant (uncredited)
 Now, Voyager (1942) - M. Henri (uncredited)
 Silver Queen (1942) - Andres
 Casablanca (1942) - Conspirator (uncredited)
 The Hard Way (1943) - Embassy Club Headwaiter (uncredited)
 Mission to Moscow (1943) - President Paul van Zeeland (uncredited)
 Background to Danger (1943) - Customs Official with Ana (uncredited)
 Appointment in Berlin (1943) - Van der Wyn (uncredited)
 Secret Service in Darkest Africa (1943) - Armand
 Wintertime (1943) - Bodreau (uncredited)
 Around the World (1943) - French Captain (uncredited)
 The Desert Song (1943) - Radek (uncredited)
 Passage to Marseille (1944) - Guard (uncredited)
 Action in Arabia (1944) - Prefect of Police (uncredited)
 The Tiger Woman (1944) - The Commandant of Police [Chs. 2-7-8 - 12] (uncredited)
 The Mask of Dimitrios (1944) - Fisherman (uncredited)
 The Desert Hawk (1944) - Emil of Telif
 Till We Meet Again (1944) - Gabriel (uncredited)
 Our Hearts Were Young and Gay (1944) - Monsieur Darnet (uncredited)
 Storm Over Lisbon (1944) - Secret Service Officer (uncredited)
 Experiment Perilous (1944) - Voice Instructor (uncredited)
 Those Endearing Young Charms (1945) - Hotel St. Mark Maitre'd (uncredited)
 Captain Eddie (1945) - French General (uncredited)
 Rhapsody in Blue (1945) - Guest (uncredited)
 You Came Along (1945) - Headwater (uncredited)
 Scotland Yard Investigator (1945) - Anton Miran (uncredited)
 This Love of Ours (1945) - Dr. Lebreton (uncredited)
 Cornered (1945) - Second Prefect (uncredited)
 Yolanda and the Thief (1945) - Train Passenger with Mink Eyebrows (uncredited)
 Saratoga Trunk (1945) - Ship Captain (uncredited)
 Tarzan and the Leopard Woman (1946) - Ivory Merchant (uncredited)
 The Hoodlum Saint (1946) - Jeweler (uncredited)
 The Catman of Paris (1946) - Guillard
 Our Hearts Were Growing Up (1946) - Maitre d' (uncredited)
 The Searching Wind (1946) - Ambassador de Frontigny (uncredited)
 Of Human Bondage (1946) - Artist (uncredited)
 The Return of Monte Cristo (1946) - Immigration Officer (uncredited)
 Ladies' Man (1947) - Mr. Jones, Hotel Manager
 The Perfect Marriage (1947) - Waiter Captain (uncredited)
 Tarzan and the Huntress (1947) - Man Weighing King (uncredited)
 The Trespasser (1947) - Waiter (uncredited)
 The Perils of Pauline (1947) - French Doctor #2 (uncredited)
 The Foxes of Harrow (1947) - Priest (uncredited)
 It's a Great Feeling (1949) - Andre Bernet (uncredited)
 Rope of Sand (1949) - Jacques the Headwaiter (uncredited)
 Fortunes of Captain Blood (1950) - Count Harrouch (uncredited)
 Secrets of Monte Carlo (1951) - Inspector Marcel Remy
 Strangers on a Train (1951) - Monsieur Darville (uncredited)
 The Law and the Lady (1951) - French Manager (uncredited)
 Mara Maru (1952) - Ortega
 Son of Ali Baba (1952) - Shah of Persia (uncredited)
 Because You're Mine (1952) - General Pierre Montal (uncredited)

Partial Theatre credits
 Goin' Home
 Diplomacy
 The Last Torture
 Antonia
 Grounds for Divorce
 The Crooked Square
 The Texas Nightingale
 The Pigeon
 Genius and the Crowd
 Mis' Nelly of N'Orleans
 Flo-Flo
 Somebody's Luggage

References

External links

 

1890s births
1969 deaths
French male film actors
French male stage actors
Hollywood blacklist
20th-century French male actors
French emigrants to the United States
Male actors from Paris